Elegías de varones ilustres de Indias is an epic poem written in the late sixteenth century by Juan de Castellanos.

Description 
The work gives a detailed account of the colonization of the Caribbean and the territories in present-day Colombia and Venezuela. It describes the settlement companies and foundation of cities as well as vivid depictions of indigenous cultures, such as the Muisca, and natural history, making this text an important early chronicle of the Spanish colonization of the Americas. Besides its historical value, it is notable for the use of multiple Renaissance-era literary styles, including the elegy, epic, pilgrimage tale, pastoral romance, chivalric romance and other literary forms.

The book contains one of the earliest descriptions of the New World species potato (Solanum colombianum), an unknown plant in the Old World before the discovery of the Americas by Europeans.

See also 

Spanish conquest of the Muisca
Gonzalo Jiménez de Quesada, El Carnero

References

External links 
  Elegías de Varones Ilustres de Indias - Complete text - Google Books

16th-century poems
Colombian books
History of the Muisca
History of Colombia